College Park may refer to:

Places

Australia
College Park, South Australia, a suburb of Adelaide

Canada
 College Park (Toronto), a shopping mall, residential and office complex in Toronto
 College Park, Saskatoon, a neighbourhood
 College Park East, Saskatoon, a neighbourhood

Republic of Ireland
 College Park, Dublin

United Kingdom
 College Park, London

United States
College Park (Charleston), a historic baseball stadium in Charleston, South Carolina
College Park, California (disambiguation)
College Park, Delaware, an unincorporated community
College Park, Orlando, a neighborhood of Orlando, Florida
College Park, Georgia, a suburb of Atlanta
College Park, Maryland, a suburb of Washington, DC
University of Maryland, College Park, the flagship state university of Maryland
College Park Airport in Prince George's County, Maryland
College Park High School (Pleasant Hill, California)
College Park (Virginia Beach), a neighborhood in the Kempsville section of Virginia Beach, Virginia, USA
The Woodlands College Park High School, in The Woodlands, Texas

Music 
College Park (album), the eighth studio album by American rapper Logic

See also
College Park Station (disambiguation)
University Park (disambiguation)
Parks College (disambiguation)